Antonio Mazzotta (born 2 August 1989) is an Italian footballer who plays as a defender for  club Bari.

Club career
Mazzotta started his career at Eccellenza Sicily amateurs Kamarat, then joining hometown club Palermo in 2006. In August 2009, he was loaned to Lecce who had recently relegated to Serie B. Mazzotta made his debut 6 days later in a 2–6 loss to Sampdoria at Coppa Italia.
After winning the 2009–10 Serie B title and therefore ensuring a place in the 2010–11 Serie A, Lecce used its option to buy half of Mazzotta's transfer rights from Palermo and sent the player out on loan to Serie B club Pescara.

In January 2011 he left Pescara due to lack of first team opportunities in order to join fellow Serie B club Crotone, again on loan from Lecce and Palermo. The loan is extended for another year. On 22 June 2012, Lecce announced from their website to have acquired the full transfer rights of Mazzotta.

He successively moved back to hometown club Palermo for the 2018–19 Serie B campaign. Following Palermo's exclusion from the Serie B, he was released together with all other players in July 2019.

On 19 August 2019, he returned to Crotone on a one-year deal.

On 4 August 2021, he signed a two-year contract with Bari in Serie C.

International career
Mazzotta represented Italy at youth U-20 level, and was part of the Italian squad at the 2009 FIFA U-20 World Cup held in Egypt, playing a total four games during the competition, also scoring a goal in the quarter finals against Hungary.

On 11 August 2010 he made his debut with the Italy U-21 team in a friendly match against Denmark.

Antonio is also a Major Shareholder in Magnis Energy Technologies an Australian ASX Listed Battery Technology Business. Antonio is very bullish on their prospects moving forward

Honours
Bari
 Serie C: 2021–22 (Group C)

References

External links
FIGC 
La Gazzetta dello Sport career profile

1989 births
Living people
Footballers from Palermo
Italian footballers
Association football fullbacks
Serie A players
Serie B players
Serie C players
Palermo F.C. players
U.S. Lecce players
Delfino Pescara 1936 players
F.C. Crotone players
A.C. Cesena players
Catania S.S.D. players
Frosinone Calcio players
S.S.C. Bari players
Italy youth international footballers
Italy under-21 international footballers